U.S. Route 95 (US 95) is a major U.S. highway traversing the U.S. state of Nevada from north to south directly through Las Vegas and providing connections to both Carson City (via US 50) and Reno (via Interstate 80). At , it is the longest highway in Nevada.

Along much of its course through Nevada, US 95 has signs designating it as the Veterans Memorial Highway. A portion of the route in Las Vegas northwest of downtown is also called the Oran K. Gragson Freeway, named for the Las Vegas mayor who advocated for construction of that portion of freeway in the 1960s.

Route description
U.S. Route 95 enters Nevada near Cal-Nev-Ari in Clark County and heads north towards Railroad Pass, where it meets Interstate 11 and US 93.

The three routes are then co-signed in the Las Vegas Valley and east of Henderson, I-11 and I-515 are co-signed with US 93/95 for its entire route around the eastern Las Vegas Valley.

I-11 ends at the Henderson Spaghetti Bowl (also known as the Hender-Bender) interchange of Interstate 215 and SR 564 and Interstate 515 begins.

The freeway then heads west into Downtown Las Vegas, where it intersects Interstate 15. At the Spaghetti Bowl interchange, US 93 follows I-15 northbound and I-515 ends.

From I-15 to Durango Drive, the freeway has HOV lanes that are currently enforced by both Metro and NHP, 24 hours a day and 7 days a week and is the only state within the nation to do so.

US 95 heads west, then north at the Rainbow Curve at Summerlin Parkway (SR 613). Eventually, the freeway passes through the Centennial Bowl with the Las Vegas Beltway (CC 215) in the northwest at Centennial Hills.

The freeway portion then ends at Corn Creek Road northwest of the Las Vegas Valley and then it becomes a brief four-lane divided highway.

US 95 exits Clark County and heads into eastern Nye County for 107 miles. The four-lane divided highway ends past the Mercury interchange.

It then enters Esmeralda and continues for 44 miles before meeting US 6 in Tonopah, back in Nye County. US 6/95 leave Tonopah, after two miles, enters Esmeralda County again and heads west for  until Coaldale, where US 6 splits west towards California and its western terminus at US 395 in Bishop, California.

US 95 then heads northwest towards Hawthorne and Schurz, where US 95 Alternate splits west towards US 50, providing an alternate route towards Carson City and Reno.

US 95 itself goes north towards Fallon, where it intersects US 50. US 95 meets Interstate 80 and US 95 Alternate about halfway between Lovelock and Fernley. The two routes then run concurrently for  until reaching Winnemucca, where US 95 splits from I-80 and follows Interstate 80 Business into downtown Winnemucca.

In downtown Winnemucca, US 95 turns north in the general direction of Paradise Valley, leaving Interstate 80 Business to follow SR 289 east. North of Winnemucca, US 95 meets the eastern terminus of SR 140, which connects to Lakeview (U.S. Route 395) and Klamath Falls, Oregon and the Pacific Northwest. US 95 finally exits Nevada at McDermitt and heads into Oregon.

History

Extension into Nevada
When the original plan for the U.S. highway system was adopted by the American Association of State Highway Officials (AASHO) in 1926, US 95 was one of the routes created. At that time, however, the route only existed in Idaho from the Canada–United States border near Eastport to Weiser near the Oregon state line.

A proposal to extend US 95 south to Winnemucca was considered by AASHO in 1937; however, action was deferred due to incomplete sections in Oregon. AASHO reconsidered the idea at its meeting on June 28, 1939, as part of a larger plan to extend the highway south to Blythe, California. This plan was adopted, officially establishing US 95 throughout Nevada effective January 1, 1940. The route was marked along several preexisting state highways as follows:
The highway turned south at Fallon, running  concurrently with the southern segment of State Route 1A to Schurz.
South of Goldfield, the highway overlapped the entire  of State Route 5, traveling southeast through Beatty and Indian Springs to Las Vegas, joining U.S. Route 93/U.S. Route 466 through Henderson to Boulder City, then splitting from US 93/466 heading south through Searchlight towards the California state line en route to Needles.

The entire route was on paved roads, except for a small portion of SR 5 between the California state line and Searchlight.

Fallon to Winnemucca realignment
When U.S. Route 95 was designated through Nevada, it avoided using a shorter alignment between Winnemucca and Fallon. The northern segment of State Route 1A had been previously established running north from Fallon to connect with US 40 southwest of Lovelock. At the time, however, this portion of SR 1A was mostly an unimproved road. State Route 1A had been completely paved by 1959, and the US 95 designation was moved over it by 1960.

When US 95 was realigned, the former route via Fernley was redesignated as alternate route. This would be the second highway to bear this designation, as another U.S. Route 95 Alternate had been created between Schurz and Fernley years earlier. The two separate alternate routes would continue to meet in Fernley until circa 1978, when U.S. Route 50 Alternate replaced the section of US 95 Alternate (original US 95) heading east towards Fallon.

Improvements in the Las Vegas metro area
When US 95 was extended through the Las Vegas Valley around 1940, it used the existing roadways traversed by State Route 5. Crossing the valley from the southeast, the U.S. highway traveled along Boulder Highway (now SR 582) through Henderson and the town of Whitney. Reaching the city limits of Las Vegas, the road changed names to Fremont Street as it headed into downtown. The route followed Las Vegas Boulevard northward briefly before going west on Bonanza Road (now SR 579). US 95 finally turned northwest on Rancho Drive (now SR 599), which became the Tonopah Highway as it traveled northwest out of the Vegas valley. Over the years, this routing of US 95 along city streets would slowly be replaced with newer, high-speed facilities.

Las Vegas Expressway
Elected in 1959, Las Vegas mayor Oran K. Gragson began advocating for regional street and planning initiatives in the growing Las Vegas Valley. In the early 1960s, Gragson had become instrumentally involved in planning what was then referred to as the "West Fremont Expressway". By 1968, the expressway was beginning to take shape, beginning at Las Vegas Boulevard downtown, interchanging with Interstate 15 and spurring west towards Rancho Drive.

The Las Vegas Expressway was slowly constructed over the next decade, reaching west to Rainbow Boulevard by 1978. A northward extension, linking the expressway to the Tonopah Highway northwest of downtown was completed around 1980. By 1982, US 95 was moved from Rancho Drive to the completed expressway alignment. Also in 1982, as the result of a petition drive, the new US 95 expressway was renamed to the "Oran K. Gragson Expressway" in honor of the four-term mayor. The Nevada Department of Transportation now recognizes this portion of US 95 as the "Oran K. Gragson Freeway".

Henderson spur
The first section of the future I-515 freeway in Las Vegas opened from the east end of the 1968-era Las Vegas Expressway at Las Vegas Boulevard to Charleston Boulevard in 1984. It was extended south to Boulder Highway (at current exit 70) by 1986. US 95 was moved from Las Vegas Boulevard, Fremont Street, and Boulder Highway onto the new freeway at that time. As additional sections of freeway were completed, both US 95 and the concurrently routed US 93 were moved to the new facility. The I-515 designation was added in 1990, but not widely signed until the completion of the entire freeway to just north of Railroad Pass in 1994. The former alignment on Fremont Street and Boulder Highway is now SR 582, though some portions of that route are now being decommissioned by the state and turned over to local entities for maintenance.

In May 2006, the (freeway-to-freeway) interchange was completed to replace the former diamond junction at Lake Mead Parkway/SR 564 (formerly known as Lake Mead Drive) and the I-215/Bruce Woodbury Beltway. The interchange at Galleria Drive (exit 64B) was opened on November 4, 2009, resulting in the renumbering of the existing junction at Sunset Road (from exit 64 to exit 64A).

In May 2020, an earthquake damaged the highway in both directions from US 6 in Coaldale to SR 360 in Mineral County.

Future

US 95 is part of a proposed northwestward extension of Interstate 11 (I-11) from Las Vegas. The interstate highway would primarily follow the US 95 corridor through central and northwestern Nevada, extending to I-80 near Reno and Sparks via Tonopah. In 2018, the Nevada Department of Transportation had initiated public outreach regarding its long-range planning efforts to narrow down options for the future I-11 corridor. Future I-11 corridor signs were installed in both directions from CC 215 to Kyle Canyon Road in 2019. In July 2022, it was decided that I-11 would follow the I-515/US 93/US 95 corridor through Las Vegas, and then run concurrent with US 95 to the interchange with SR 157.

Major intersections

Note: Mileposts in Nevada reset at county lines. The start and end mileposts for each county are given in the county column.

Special routes
 U.S. Route 95 Alternate, an alternate route beginning in Schurz serving Yerington, Silver Springs and Fernley
 U.S. Route 95 Business, a business route in Las Vegas
 U.S. Route 95 Truck, a truck bypass of Hawthorne

References

 

95
 Nevada
Transportation in Clark County, Nevada
Transportation in the Las Vegas Valley
Transportation in Nye County, Nevada
Transportation in Esmeralda County, Nevada
Transportation in Mineral County, Nevada
Transportation in Lyon County, Nevada
Transportation in Churchill County, Nevada
Transportation in Pershing County, Nevada
Transportation in Humboldt County, Nevada